David Houghton is a former association football goalkeeper who represented New Zealand at international level.

Houghton made a solitary official international appearance for New Zealand in a 2–3 loss to New Caledonia on 29 July 1969.

References 

Year of birth missing (living people)
Living people
New Zealand association footballers
New Zealand international footballers
Association football goalkeepers
Stop Out players